Mas'ūd III of Ghazna (b. 1061 – d. 1115), was a sultan of the Ghaznavid Empire and son of Ibrahim of Ghazna.

Life 
Mas'ūd was born in 1061 in Ghazni.

Reign 
Mas'ud was sultan for 16 years. In 1112, Mas'ūd III built the Palace of Sultan Mas'ud III in Ghazni, Afghanistan. Mas'ūd also built one of the Minarets of Ghazni. Signs of weakness in the state became apparent when he died in 1115, with internal strife between his sons ending with the ascension of Sultan Bahram Shah as a Seljuk vassal. Bahram Shah defeated his brother Arslan for the throne at the Battle of Ghazni in 1117.

Architecture

Minaret of Mas'ud III in Ghazni

Palace of Mas'ud III in Ghazni

See also 
 Ghazni under the Ghaznavids

References

Ghaznavid rulers
12th-century rulers in Asia